The Myanmar Ambassador in Moscow is the official representative of the Government in Naypyidaw to the Government of Russia.

History
Since 1989 Union of Myanmar

List of representatives

See also
 List of ambassadors of Russia to Myanmar

References 

 
Russia
Myanmar